Samir Vincent also known as Samir Ambrose Vincent (born 23 October 1940) is an ethnic Assyrian Iraqi American that pleaded guilty in January 2005 to being an illegal agent for Saddam Hussein's government and helping to skim money from the Oil-for-Food Programme which earned him millions of dollars in the process.

Oil-for-Food Programme Scandal

In the aftermath of the Gulf War, the U.N. imposed sanctions on Iraq. As an unregistered agent for the Iraqi government, Vincent began lobbying in the U.S. for an end to the U.N. sanctions on the sale of Iraqi oil. Vincent remained largely unsuccessful in his efforts until 1992 when he was introduced to Tongsun Park, who arranged for him to meet Boutros Boutros-Ghali, then the secretary-general of the United Nations. The Oil-for-Food Programme was set up to allow Iraq to sell its oil in return for humanitarian relief, so it would not breach sanctions imposed after the first Iraq war. However it transpired that the former Iraqi regime - which decided who could buy Iraqi oil - used the scheme to bribe people by awarding them contracts in return for a surcharge.

Vincent eventually admitted to charges of fraud, tax violations and acting and conspiring to act as an unregistered agent of the Iraqi government.

1964 Summer Olympics
Vincent was also a competitor in the 1964 Summer Olympics in Tokyo, Japan for Iraq. He took part in the 110 and 400 meter Hurdles, the Triple Jump and 4 x 100 metre Relay.

References

1940 births
Living people
American lobbyists
United Nations Oil-for-Food scandal
Money laundering
Olympic athletes of Iraq
Athletes (track and field) at the 1964 Summer Olympics
Iraqi male hurdlers
Iraqi male sprinters
Iraqi male triple jumpers
Iraqi emigrants to the United States